Chamaita hirta is a moth of the family Erebidae first described by Alfred Ernest Wileman in 1911. It is found in Taiwan.

The wingspan is 15–16 mm.

References

Moths described in 1911
Nudariina
Moths of Taiwan